Safoora Goth  is a neighborhood in the Karachi East district of Karachi, Pakistan. It was previously administered as part of the Gulshan Town borough.

See also
Malir Cantonment
Karachi Institute of Radiotherapy and Nuclear Medicine
2015 Karachi bus shooting

References

External links 
 Karachi Metropolitan Corporation official website (Archived)
Metropolitan University Karachi

Neighbourhoods of Karachi
Gulshan Town